Giovanni Paolo Meniconi (1629 – 24 December 1694) was a Roman Catholic prelate who served as Bishop of Bagnoregio (1680–1694).

Biography
Giovanni Paolo Meniconi was born in Perugia, Italy in 1629. On 29 April 1680, he was appointed during the papacy of Pope Innocent XI as Bishop of Bagnoregio. On 1 May 1680, he was consecrated bishop by Federico Baldeschi Colonna, Cardinal-Priest of San Marcello, with Francesco Casati, Titular Archbishop of Trapezus, and Prospero Bottini, Titular Archbishop of Myra, serving as co-consecrators. He served as Bishop of Bagnoregio until his death on 24 December 1694.

References

External links and additional sources
 (for Chronology of Bishops) 
 (for Chronology of Bishops) 

17th-century Italian Roman Catholic bishops
Bishops appointed by Pope Innocent XI
1629 births
1694 deaths